Albanian National Reconciliation Party (in Albanian: Partia e Pajtimit Kombëtar Shqiptar) is a political party in Albania, led by Spartak Dobi. The party was founded in 1998. It had 0.02% of the votes in the National Lower House Elections in 2001.

References 

Political parties in Albania
1998 establishments in Albania
Political parties established in 1998